Louisiana Literature is a literary magazine.  Founded in 1984 by Southeastern Louisiana University, it publishes fiction, poetry, and creative nonfiction quarterly. As of 2006 the magazine was published biannually.

Editors
Editor, as of October 2009, was Jack Bedell.

Honors and awards
 Writer's Digest named Louisiana Literature a "Top 50" market for both fiction and poetry in 2008.

Masthead
As of October 2009:
Editor:  Jack B. Bedell
Associate Editors: Norman German, William Parrill
On-line Editor:  Chris Tusa

See also 
List of literary magazines

References

External links
Louisiana Literature website

1984 establishments in Louisiana
Literary magazines published in the United States
Quarterly magazines published in the United States
Biannual magazines published in the United States
Magazines established in 1984
Magazines published in Louisiana